Rabbinical College of Canada (also known as Yeshivas Tomchei Temimim Lubavitch), is a Chabad rabbinical institution of higher education. It is located in Montreal, Quebec, Canada.

The Yeshiva provides rabbinical ordination for its students (also known as "Tmimim") in the Chabad Hasidic community.

History
Although the school was established by Rabbi Yosef Yitzchok Schneersohn from New York City in 1941, the yeshiva had an extensive history (not only in its hometown of Montreal, but in Eastern Europe as well). At one time, the school had one of the most respected rabbinical ordination programs, thanks to the tireless work and dedication of the late Rabbi Issac Schwei, Rabbi Yitzchak HaCohen Hendel and Rabbi Pinchas Hirschsprung, who were notable Torah scholars in Montreal.

The history of the institution began with the arrival of 9 Yeshiva students from Shanghai, China who fled Poland during World War II. Another set of teachers and students arrived from a Canadian POW holding camp in New Brunswick, (Austrian Jewish citizens deported from England during the war).

Many of the students in the 1940s were immigrants who has fled Europe, establishing a small traditional Jewish community in Montreal. When first opened, the school had 24 students; a year later it had over 200 students.

The school was initially located on Avenue du Parc, in the Plateau Mont Royal district. From 1963 The yeshiva is located at 6405 Westbury Avenue on the corner of Avenue Plamondon in the Cote-des-Neiges district of Montreal.

Notable alumni
Moshe Gutnick

See also
Tomchei Temimim

References

External links
Chabad.org: Rabbinical College of Canada

Chabad in Canada
Orthodox yeshivas in Canada
Chabad schools
Education in Montreal
Colleges in Quebec
Yosef Yitzchak Schneersohn
Jewish seminaries
1941 establishments in Quebec
Educational institutions established in 1941
Chabad yeshivas